Caboolture State High School is a coeducational independent public secondary school located in Caboolture in the local government area of the Moreton Bay Region in Queensland, Australia.

Since October 2018, Caboolture State High School's role of the Principal of the School has been held by Fiona Free. The school also consists of Six Deputy Principals, Two Business Manager, Seventeen Heads of Department, Three Guidance Officers, One School Nurse, One Chaplain, One Youth Support Worker, One Community Education Counsellor, Six Year Level Coordinators.

Curriculum

English

English is a compulsory core subject across the Year 7–10 curriculum. English subjects available to students in Years 11 and 12 include the General subject of English and the Applied subject of Essential English.

Mathematics

Mathematics is a compulsory core subject across the Year 7–10 curriculum. Students in Year 10 have the option to undertake either Core Mathematics or Extension Mathematics. Mathematics subjects available to students in Years 11 and 12 include the General subjects of General Mathematics, Mathematical Methods and Specialist Mathematics, and the Applied subject of Essential Mathematics.

Social Science & Business

The compulsory core subjects of History and Geography are studied for one semester across the Year 7–9 curriculum. In Year 10, students have the option of studying the core subjects of History or Introduction to Senior History, whereas the subjects of Business Information Technology, Geography and Justice Studies are studied as elective subjects. Social Science & Business subjects available to students in Years 11 and 12 include the General subjects of Ancient History, Business, Geography, Legal Studies and Modern History, and the Applied subject of Social & Community Studies.

Science

Science is a compulsory core subject across the Year 7–10 curriculum. Science subjects available to students in Years 11 and 12 include the General subjects of Biology, Chemistry, Marine Science and Physics, and the Applied subject of Aquatic Practices.

Health & Physical Education

Health & Physical Education is a compulsory core subject studied for one semester across the Year 7–10 curriculum. In Year 10, students have the option of undertaking Health & Physical Education or Introduction to Senior Health/HPE. Health & Physical Education subjects available to students in Years 11 and 12 include the General subjects of Health Education and Physical Education, and the Applied subjects of Early Childhood Studies and Sport & Recreation.

Chinese

Chinese is the Language Other Than English administered at Caboolture State High School, which is studied by all students in Years 7 and 8 for one semester and is an elective subject from Years 9–12.

Agriculture

The subject of Agricultural Science is studied as a rotational subject for one term by all students in Year 7. In Year 8, the subject of Agriculture is studied as an elective subject. The subject of Rural Operations is an elective subject available to students in Year 9, whereas the subject of Animal Husbandry & Farm Practices is an elective subject available to students in Years 9 and 10. The General subject of Agricultural Science is available to students in Years 11 and 12.

The Arts

Students in Year 7 undertake one of the Arts subjects of Music, Music Extension (by application only), Performing Arts and Visual Art for one term. Elective Arts subjects available to students in Years 8–10 include Dance, Drama, Music, Music Extension (Years 8 and 9 only) and Visual Art. Arts subjects available to students in Years 11 and 12 include the General subjects of Dance, Drama, Music and Visual Art, and the Applied subject of Visual Arts in Practice.

Industrial Technology

Industrial Technology is studied as a rotational subject for one term by all students in Year 7. The Industrial Technology subjects of Computer Aided Design, Metal Technology and Wood technology are undertaken as elective subjects by students in Years 8–10. Industrial Technology subjects available to students in Years 11 and 12 include the General subject of Design and the Applied subjects of Construction Skills, Engineering Skills and Furnishing Skills.

Lifestyle Technology

Home Economics is studied as a rotational subject for one term by all students in Year 7. In Year 8, Home Economics is studied as an elective subject for one term, whereas in Year 9, it is studied for one semester and for the full year in Year 10. Lifestyle Technology subjects available to students in Years 11 and 12 include the General subject of Food & Nutrition and the Applied subject of Fashion.

Technologies

The subject of Digital Technologies is studied as an elective subject for one term in Year 8 and for one semester in Year 9. The General subject of Digital Solutions is available to students in Years 11 and 12.

LearnIT

LearnIT was Excellence Program available to high-achieving students from Years 7 to 10. Students had to complete an interview process and obtain evidence of academic success, behavior and work ethic to be eligible for the program. They also had the opportunity to obtain a Certificate II in Information, Digital Media & Technology by the end of Year 10. The program was since discontinued at the end of 2019, with the last of its students completing it in 2022, and graduating in 2024.

Vocational Education & Training

Vocational Education & Training (VET) courses available to students in Year 10 include:
 Certificate I in AgriFood Operations (AHC10216)
 Certificate I in Information, Digital Media & Technology (ICT10115)
 Certificate II in Information, Digital Media & Technology (ICT20115) (LearnIT only)

VET courses available to students in Years 11 and 12 include:

 Certificate II in Creative Industries (Media) (CUA20215)
 Certificate II in Hospitality (SIT20136)
 Certificate II in Rural Operations (AHC21216)
 Certificate III in Business (BSB30115)
 Certificate III in Information, Digital Media & Technology (ICT30115)
 Certificate III in Sport and Recreation (SIS30115)

Extra-curricular activities

Extra-curricular activities available to students at Caboolture State High School include:
 Camps
 Year 12 leadership camp; Noosa North Shore
 Year 12 ski trip; Perisher Ski Resort
 Chinese overseas trip to China
 Cattle Club
 Public speaking
 Lions' Youth of the Year
 Plain English Speaking
 Quota
 Rotary
 Zonta Young Women in Public Speaking Award
 Queensland Debating Society competition

Notable alumni
 Ian Baker-Finch, golfer and sports commentator
 Glen Boss, jockey
 Catherine Clark, sports administrator
 Sarah Harris, television presenter and journalist
 Andrew Lofthouse, radio and television news reporter
 Keith Urban, country music singer, songwriter and record producer
 Brian to’o, Professional rugby league player
 Corey Horsbrough, professional rugby league player

References

External links
 

Schools in South East Queensland
Public high schools in Queensland
Educational institutions established in 1961
1961 establishments in Australia
Caboolture, Queensland
Buildings and structures in Moreton Bay Region